The san yan chong was a three barrel hand cannon  used in the Ming dynasty.

The distinctive San Yan Chong 三眼銃, or three eyed gun was one of the most common Ming hand cannons. Three eyed guns were usually made from cast iron or crude steel, each of the three eyed gun's metal tubes would have a small hole that allows the user to pour in gunpowder. Functionally they were no different from many contemporary European hand cannons- a solid metallic head with an aperture behind it for different tail fittings to be attached~ ranging from the butt of a staff, a spearhead, to a specialized short curved stock with a raised sight that enabled the gunner to fire it while kneeling- these would be called "Divine Machines."

Historians have attributed their design to be refined from primitive fire lances- which consisted of bundles of single joint of bamboos tied around a spear. As time progressed though, metal barrels appeared during the 12th century, and could not only shoot out spouts of flames like a small flame thrower but they could also fire porcelain shards or metal scraps as shrapnel. The three headed gun would standardize the rounds and became the next evolution of the fire lance- on top of standardizing the rounds, which ranged from rounds of steel balls to shrapnel, to rough iron sand.

Though they the three eyed guns and all of its variants were developed roughly in tandem with contemporary European hand guns, even after superior European guns were introduced to China via Portuguese merchants in the 16th century the Ming still fielded them in the tens of thousands to work in conjunction with whole new divisions fully equipped with western muskets.

As the Ming dynasty neared its collapse, the production and deployment of these multi-barreled guns actually rose drastically against the rising Manchu threat.

References

Early firearms
Weapons of China
Firearms of China